Madurai Central Prison is located in Madurai, India. The prison complex occupies . It is authorised to accommodate 1252 prisoners.

History 
The prison was built in 1865.

References

External links 
Tamil Nadu Prison Department

Prisons in Tamil Nadu
Buildings and structures in Madurai